John Devine (born 27 January 1969) is a Northern Irish former footballer who played at both semi-professional and international levels as a defender.

Career

Club career
Born in Carrickfergus, Devine played youth-football with Island Magee, Chimney Corner and Carnmoney Colts, before playing senior football with Glentoran, Coleraine, Glenavon and Larne. While at Larne, Devine was player-manager.

International career
In 1990, Devine represented Northern Ireland at both under-21 and under-23 levels, before making his senior debut later that same year.

References

1969 births
Living people
Association footballers from Northern Ireland
Northern Ireland international footballers
Football managers from Northern Ireland
Chimney Corner F.C. players
Glentoran F.C. players
Coleraine F.C. players
Glenavon F.C. players
Larne F.C. players
Association football defenders